Devlok with Devdutt Pattanaik is an Indian Hindi television series which airs on the EPIC Channel. The show is based on Indian mythology and presented by mythologist Devdutt Pattanaik. The show takes viewers on a story of Indian mythology and highlights characters, stories, events and symbols. Devdutt Pattanaik shares his expertise by attempting to demystify and decode the folklore and traditions that accompanies Indian mythology.
 It is now available on EPIC On, EPIC TV's streaming platform.

Show summary
The show is a tête-à-tête between the host and the presenter Rasika Dugal, Himanshi Choudhry and mythologist Devdutt Pattanaik.

No culture exists without mythology and in Devlok, Devdutt Pattanaik, through his discussion redefines mythology as something that is comprehensive, acknowledging the subjective truth of humanity and something that is indifferent to rationality.

In each episode, Devdutt covers one phenomenon from the great texts. From the concept of the Holy Triad – Brahma, Vishnu and Shiva to the different avatars of the Goddess Durga, each episode is engaging and addictive. Devdutt in his own unique conversational style makes mythology relevant to the common man. The series premiered on The EPIC Channel on 21 October 2015 with 26 episodes. The show gained immense popularity and on demand of viewers, the channel sanctioned the second season of the show. Second season of the show started on 11 July, 2016 with 30 episodes which was hosted by Rasika Duggal.

Episode themes
In Devlok, Devdutt attempts to answer questions like – is mythology fiction or non-fiction, religion or tradition, fantasy or history? He does this by taking the viewer through the origins and evolution of various concepts and through stories which explain this progression. In his own inimitable style, Devdutt also puts these stories into a modern-day context explaining their relevance for our quotidian lives. He also discusses mythology in relevance to what it means rather what it symbolizes and represents in terms of our cultural identity.

Human beings have used stories from mythology to make sense of their world from time immemorial and it is this understanding of the world that Devdutt attempts to explain. He brings to the forefront the common structures underlying these stories, symbols and rituals of communities, decodes them and puts them in context of today's world.

Cast
Devdutt Pattanaik as Story teller
Rasika Duggal as Presentar
 Himanshi Choudhry as Presenter 
Ujjawal Gauraha as Hanuman in a story from Ramayan
Athar Siddiqui as YUDHISTRA

References

Hindi-language television shows
Indian mythological television series
2015 Indian television series debuts
Epic TV original programming